Oxalis tuberosa is a perennial herbaceous plant that overwinters as underground stem tubers. These tubers are known as uqa in Quechua, oca in Spanish, yams in New Zealand and a number of other alternative names. The plant was brought into cultivation in the central and southern Andes for its tubers, which are used as a root vegetable. The plant is not known in the wild, but populations of wild Oxalis species that bear smaller tubers are known from four areas of the central Andean region. Oca was introduced to Europe in 1830 as a competitor to the potato, and to New Zealand as early as 1860.

In New Zealand, oca has become a popular table vegetable and are simply called yams (although not a true yam). It is available in a range of colours, including yellow, orange, pink, apricot, and the traditional red.

Cultural significance
Grown primarily by Quechua and Aymara farmers, oca has been a staple of rural Andean diets for centuries. Of all Andean root and tuber crops, oca is currently second only to potato in area planted within the Central Andean region. Oca is important to local food security because of its role in crop rotations and its high nutritional content.

Diversity

Andean farmers, including the indigenous Quechua and Aymara people, cultivate numerous varieties of oca. Oca diversity may be described with respect to morphological characters, local cultivar names, or molecular markers.

Morphological characters
Oca morphotypes are distinguished by foliar, floral, fruit, stem, and tuber characteristics, as described in the International Plant Genetic Resources Institute's document on oca descriptors. The morphological diversity of oca tubers, in particular, is astounding. Tubers range from 25 to 150 mm in length by 25 mm in width; skin and flesh color may be white, cream, yellow, orange, pink, red, and/or purple and distributed in range of patterns.

Local cultivar names
Oca-growing communities often name varieties based primarily on tuber morphology and secondarily on flavor. For example, common names may include ushpa negra (black ash) or puka panti (red Cosmos peucedanifolius). Great inconsistency of nomenclature has been reported within and among communities.

Molecular markers
Numerous studies have additionally described oca diversity through molecular approaches to study protein and genetic variation. Molecular markers, such as allozymes (e.g., del Río, 1999) and inter-simple sequence repeats (e.g., Pissard et al., 2006), show oca diversity to be low relative to other crops, probably because of its vegetative mode of propagation. While genetic differentiation corresponds well with folk classification, cluster analyses indicate that folk cultivars are not perfect clones, but rather genetically heterogeneous groupings.

Edibility
Oca is cultivated primarily for its edible stem tuber, but the leaves and young shoots can be eaten as a green vegetable also. Mature stems can be used similarly to rhubarb. Andean communities have various methods to process and prepare tubers, and in Mexico oca is eaten raw with salt, lemon, and hot pepper. The flavour is often slightly tangy, but there is a considerable degree of difference in flavors between varieties and some are not acidic at all. Texture ranges from crunchy (like a carrot) when raw or undercooked, to starchy or mealy when fully cooked.

Use categories
Oca is fairly high in oxalates, concentrated in the skin. Significant variation in oxalate concentration exists among varieties, and this variation distinguishes two oca use-categories recognized by Andean farmers.

One use-category, sour oca, contains cultivars with high levels of oxalic acid. Farmers process these tubers to form a usable storage product, called khaya in Quechua. To prepare khaya, tubers are first soaked in water for approximately one month. Then they are left outside during hot, sunny days and cold, freezing nights until they become completely dehydrated. This process is similar to the preparation of chuñu from bitter potatoes. Cultivars in this use category are referred to in Quechua as khaya (name of the dried, processed product) or p'usqu (sour/fermented), and in Aymara as luk’i.

The other use-category, sweet oca, contains cultivars with lower levels of oxalic acid. The traditional Andean preparation methods for this use-category are also geared towards reducing the oxalate level of the harvested vegetable, but without dehydration. This is done by exposure to sunlight, which decreases the organic acid content and thereby increases the sweet taste of the oca.

Once exposed to sunlight, oca can be boiled, baked or fried. In the Andes it is used in stews and soups, served like potatoes, or can be served as a sweet. Cultivars in this category are referred to in Quechua as wayk'u (boiling), misk'i (sweet/delicious) and in Aymara as q'ini.

Sour oca and sweet oca form distinct genetic clusters based on AFLP data. This suggests the possibility of distinct evolutionary histories for each use-category.

Nutrition 
Oca is a source of carbohydrates, dietary minerals, and protein. Cultivars vary substantially in nutritional content.

Cultivation

Oca is one of the important staple crops of the Andean highlands, due to its easy propagation, and tolerance for poor soil, high altitude and harsh climates.

Distribution
Oca is planted in the Andean region from Venezuela to Argentina, from 2800 to 4100 meters above sea level. Its highest abundance and greatest diversity are in central Peru and northern Bolivia, the probable area of its domestication.

Climate requirements
Oca needs a long growing season, and is day length dependent, forming tubers when the day length shortens in autumn (around March in the Andes). In addition, oca requires climates with average temperatures of approximately 10 to 12 °C (ranging between 4 and 17 °C) and average precipitation of 700 to 885 millimeters per year.

Oca requires short days in order to form tubers. Outside the tropics, it will not begin to form tubers until approximately the autumn equinox. If frosts occur too soon after the autumn equinox, the plant will die before tubers are produced.

Soil requirements
Oca grows with very low production inputs, generally on plots of marginal soil quality, and tolerates acidities between about pH 5.3 and 7.8. In traditional Andean cropping systems, it is often planted after potato and therefore benefits from persisting nutrients applied to, or left over from, the potato crop.

Propagation
Oca is usually propagated vegetatively by planting whole tubers.

Propagation by seed is possible but is rarely used in practice. Sexual propagation is complicated by several factors. First, like many other species in the genus Oxalis, oca flowers exhibit tristylous heterostyly and are consequently subject to auto-incompatibility. Furthermore, on the rare occasion that oca plants do produce fruit, their loculicidal capsules dehisce spontaneously, making it difficult to harvest seed. Oca flowers are pollinated by insects (e.g., genera Apis, Megachile, and Bombus).

Cropping factors
Oca tuber-seeds are planted in the Andes in August or September and harvested from April to June. The first flowers bloom around three to four months after planting, and the tubers also begin to form then. Between planting and harvesting, the oca crop requires little tending, except for a couple of weedings and hillings.  
	
Oca is a component of traditional crop rotations and is usually planted in a field directly after the potato harvest. A common sequence in this rotation system may be one year of potato, one year of oca, one year of oats or faba beans, and two to four years fallow. Within this system, q’allpa is a Quechua term that signifies soil previously cultivated and prepared for planting of a new crop.

The cultural practice is similar to potatoes. Planting is done in rows or hills 80–100 cm apart, with plants spaced 40–60 cm apart in the rows. Monoculture predominates, but interplanting with several other tuber species, including mashua and olluco, in one field is common in Andean production. Often this intercoppng consists of several different varieties of each species. Such mixed fields may later be sorted into tuber types during harvest or before cooking.

Harmine found in root secretions of O. tuberosa has been found to have insecticidal properties.

Yields
Yields vary with the cultural method. Annals from Andean countries report about 7-10 tonnes per hectare for O. tuberosa production. But with adequate inputs and virus free propagation material, oca production can range from 35 to 55 tonnes per hectare.

Limitations
Pests and diseases limit the production of oca. Crops in the Andes are often infected with viruses, causing chronic yield depression. Adequate techniques to remove viruses have to be applied before the varieties can be used outside the Andean region. Cultivation is also constrained by the Andean potato weevil (Premnotrypes spp), ulluco weevil (Cylydrorhinus spp), and oca weevil, the identification of which remains uncertain (possibly Adioristidius, Mycrotrypes, or Premnotrypes). These weevils often destroy entire crops. Further notable pests are nematodes.

As already mentioned, both day-length restrictions and the presence of oxalates can also be considered limiting factors. Scientists work with specific breeding, selection, and virus cleaning programs on these purposes.

Conservation efforts
A number of ongoing ex situ and in situ conservation projects currently focus on the preservation of O. tuberosa diversity. The International Potato Center (CIP) in Peru has several hundred accessions of oca collected from regions in Bolivia, Argentina and Peru to help ensure and maintain diversity. Currently, there are further efforts to collect accession of oca in regions where habitat destruction and pests are threatening diversity of wild oca accessions.

Alternative names
 Apilla in Bolivia
 Apiña in Bolivia and Peru
 Batata-baroa or mandioquinha (literally, 'little mandioca') in Brazil, a name shared with the unrelated arracacha
 Cuiba or quiba in Venezuela
 Hibia or cubio in Colombia
 Macachin or miquichi in Venezuela
 Papa extranjera in Mexico
 Huasisai, qua or ibi in Peru,
 Truffette acide in France
 Yam in many other places, such as Polynesia and New Zealand, where the Dioscorea vegetables known elsewhere as yams are uncommon

See also
 New World crops
 Mashua
 Yacón
 Ulluco

References

Further reading

External links

Oca in Lost Crops of the Incas
NewCROP page on oca
Andean root and tuber crops at the International Potato Center
Oca, ulluco, and mashua at the International Potato Center
Oxalis tuberosa at Plants for a Future

Root vegetables
tuberosa
Crops originating from the Americas
Crops originating from Bolivia
Crops originating from Ecuador
Crops originating from Peru
Edible plants
Perennial vegetables
Tubers